Balewal is a village in Malerkotla in Malerkotla district of Punjab State, India. The village is administrated by Sarpanch an elected representative of the village.

See also
List of villages in India

References 

Villages in Malerkotla district